Scincella huanrenensis  is a species of skink found in Liaoning in Northeast China and in Korea. The specific name refers to its type locality, Huanren County in Liaoning.

References

Scincella
Reptiles of China
Reptiles of Korea
Reptiles described in 1982
Taxa named by Zhao Ermi
Taxa named by Kang-cai Huang